The 1925 Pacific Tigers football team represented the College of the Pacific—now known as the University of the Pacific—in Stockton, California as a member of the Far Western Conference (FWC) during the 1925 college football season. 1925 was the inaugural season of play for the FWC. Pacific had competed as an independent in 1924. The team was led by fifth-year head coach Erwin Righter and played home games at a field on campus in Stockton. Pacific compiled an overall record of 5–2 with a mark of 1–2 in conference play, placing fourth in the FWC. The Tigers outscored their opponents 71–46 for the season.

Schedule

Notes

References

Pacific
Pacific Tigers football seasons
Pacific Tigers football